Bostan (also Romanized as Bostān; also known as al-Basāţīn, al-Bisaitin, and Bustān) is a city and capital of Bostan District, in Dasht-e Azadegan County, Khuzestan Province, Iran. It is located approximately 10 miles from the Iran-Iraq border.  At the 2006 census, its population was 7,314, in 1,257 families. It is mainly known for its battles during the Iran–Iraq War, the Operation Tariq al-Qods.

See also 

 Iran-Iraq war
 Khorramshahr
 Susangerd
 Shadegan
 Hoveyzeh

References

 Official Site of Holy Defiance

Populated places in Dasht-e Azadegan County
Cities in Khuzestan Province